Tabanus nigrovittatus, also known as the greenhead horse fly, salt marsh greenhead, or simply the greenhead fly, greenhead or greenfly, is a species of biting horse-fly commonly found around coastal marshes of the Eastern United States. They are much smaller than most horsefly species, instead being close in size to a common housefly. The biting females are a considerable pest to both humans and animals while they seek a source of blood protein to produce additional eggs. Females live for three to four weeks and may lay about 100 to 200 eggs per blood meal.

Affected coastal communities install black box traps in marsh areas to reduce and control T. nigrovittatus populations.

References

Tabanidae
Insects described in 1847
Diptera of North America
Fauna of the Eastern United States
Taxa named by Pierre-Justin-Marie Macquart